Below is a list of the 2021 FIFA Club World Cup squads. Each team had to name a 23-man squad (three of whom had to be goalkeepers). Injury replacements were allowed until 24 hours before the team's first match.

Al Ahly 
Manager:  Pitso Mosimane

Al-Hilal 
Manager:  Leonardo Jardim

Al-Jazira

AS Pirae
Manager:  Naea Bennett

Chelsea 
Manager:  Thomas Tuchel

Monterrey 
Manager:  Javier Aguirre

Palmeiras 
Manager:  Abel Ferreira

References

External links
 Official 2021 FIFA Club World Cup website

Squads
FIFA Club World Cup squads